The Winning Goal is a 1920 British silent sports film directed by G. B. Samuelson and starring Harold Walden, Maudie Dunham and Tom Reynolds. It was based on the play The Game by Harold Brighouse. It was set in Lancashire against a backdrop of the fictional Association football team Blackton Rovers. Chelsea player Jack Cock appeared as himself in the film and 16-then international players featured as members of two fictional teams. Match footage was shot at Brentford's Griffin Park ground.

Cast
 Harold Walden as Jack Metherill 
 Maudie Dunham as Elsie Whitworth 
 Tom Reynolds as Uncle Edmond 
 Haidee Wright as Mrs. Whitworth 
 Jack Cock as himself

References

External links

1920 films
1920s sports films
1920s English-language films
Films directed by G. B. Samuelson
British films based on plays
British association football films
Films set in Lancashire
Films produced by G. B. Samuelson
British silent feature films
British black-and-white films
1920s British films
Silent sports films